Thomas Creek is a stream, about  long, in Linn County in the U.S. state of Oregon. Beginning in Willamette National Forest on the western slopes of the Cascade Range, the creek flows generally west through Santiam State Forest and farmland to meet the South Santiam River west of Scio.

Three covered bridges, all listed on the National Register of Historic Places, carry traffic over the creek. Two other covered bridges that originally crossed Thomas Creek were moved to parks in cities outside the creek's watershed. Several covered bridges that once spanned the creek were destroyed in weather-related incidents or were otherwise demolished.

The creek at times has flooded Scio, particularly in 1964. The drop in elevation on its upper reaches, coupled with its flow volume, make it suitable at times for whitewater canoes and kayaks. The stream supports populations of smallmouth bass, cutthroat trout, and other fish.

Course
Thomas Creek is a tributary of the South Santiam River. The creek flows generally west from its source, receiving Hall and other small creeks before reaching the unincorporated community of Jordan. Jordan Creek enters from the right at about river mile (RM) 19.

Downstream of Jordan, other small tributaries enter before Thomas Creek flows by a stream gauge operated by the United States Geological Survey at RM 14.2. The creek then passes under Oregon Route 226 before reaching Scio. The North and South Santiam combine to form the Santiam River, a tributary of the Willamette River.

Discharge
During those years, the maximum discharge of  occurred on December 22, 1964, and the minimum of  occurred on September 6, 2003.

Floods
The entire city of Scio lies in a floodplain with a 1 percent annual chance of a flood. All of Scio was flooded in December 1964, when Thomas Creek and Peters Ditch overflowed their banks. The flooding was generally shallow except near the creek, where it reached  in depth. A flood of this size along the creek is expected, on average, only once in 200 years. The inundation was part of a state-wide series of floods known as the Christmas flood of 1964, rated by the National Weather Service as one of Oregon's top 10 weather events of the 20th century. In January 1972, Scio was flooded again when the discharge at the gauge reached .

Covered bridges

Several covered bridges have spanned Thomas Creek since the late 19th century, some of them replacements for damaged or demolished bridges at the same spots. Three of these bridges—Gilkey, Shimanek, and Hannah—still cross the creek, while two—Weddle and Jordan—have been moved to cities outside the Thomas Creek watershed. The three that still cross the creek are on the National Register of Historic Places (NRHP). The Weddle Bridge was listed on the NRHP in 1979 but delisted in 1991 after its move to Sweet Home.

The road bridge, a  structure of the Howe truss type, was built in 1939, damaged and closed in 1997, repaired and re-opened in 1998. The companion railroad bridge, a  Howe truss span, was removed in 1962. The Gilkey Covered Bridge carries Goar Road over the creek.

The Weddle Bridge, which replaced an earlier covered bridge at the same site, once crossed Thomas Creek near Scio, at about RM 9. In the late 1980s, the deteriorating structure, no longer in use, was scheduled for destruction. Efforts to save it led the Oregon Legislative Assembly to create the Oregon Covered Bridge Program, aimed at preserving the state's covered bridges. Weddle Bridge was the first bridge to win a grant from the program. In 1989, a group in Sweet Home raised additional funds to have the bridge moved and installed across Ames Creek in that city's Sankey Park.

Shimanek Bridge, upstream of Scio at about RM 12, is a  Howe truss structure built in 1966. It is the newest and longest covered bridge in Linn County. At least four other covered bridges crossed Thomas Creek at this same spot, the first documented one in 1891. Storms and floods damaged the earlier bridges. The Shimanek Bridge carries Richardson Gap Road over the creek.

Another covered bridge, built in 1912, is thought to have crossed the creek slightly upstream of the Hannah Bridge but was torn down and its lumber used in farm buildings. Burmester Creek Road crosses the Hannah Bridge.

The Jordan Bridge, built in 1937 at about RM 19, was a  Howe truss span. Dismantled in 1985, its timbers were moved to Stayton and reassembled in that city's Pioneer Park. Destroyed by fire in 1994, it was rebuilt in the park in 1998.

Recreation
The creek supports populations of smallmouth bass and cutthroat trout as well as small runs of Chinook salmon and steelhead. The stream is closed to fishing for salmon and steelhead, but anglers can fish for bass, and catch-and-release fishing for trout is allowed.

Whitewater enthusiasts sometimes run a  segment of the upper creek from Hall Creek to 5-Mile Bridge. This stretch is rated 3 (intermediate) to 4 (advanced) on the International Scale of River Difficulty. Hazards include fast water, rocky ledges, submerged or floating logs, a "nasty chute", and a debris dam.

The next , from 5-Mile Bridge to Hannah Bridge is also run. It is rated class 2+ or class 3, depending on the flow volume, and at least one portage is required. Hazards include overhanging brush under which the current may sweep a canoe or kayak.

See also
 List of rivers of Oregon

References

Works cited
 

Rivers of Linn County, Oregon
Rivers of Oregon